Roland Moore is a British screenwriter, playwright and author, best known as the creator and lead writer of the period drama series Land Girls for BBC One.

Career
Moore began as a playwright, producing short low budget productions. He subsequently moved into television, writing for series such as Smack the Pony, Rastamouse, Peter Rabbit, and became a prolific writer on Doctors, writing 48 episodes.

His first feature, the teen adventure 2: hrs, was crowdfunded on Indiegogo. It's about a teenage boy who discovers he only has a short while to live. It made its debut on VOD on 30 July 2018.

Land Girls
Land Girls was conceived by Moore, who wanted to cover the subject matter of the Women's Land Army in an ensemble drama. Once he had the idea, Moore set about creating the characters of Nancy, Joyce, Annie and Bea and devising story ideas from them. Moore named the four main characters after his grandmother and great-aunts, which made the names authentic for the time period. He also read accounts from real life land girls to make sure his stories were believable. The BBC announced the commission of Land Girls in June 2009, revealing that the series would air from 7 September 2009 to commemorate the 70th anniversary of the start of the Second World War.

Land Girls won "Best Daytime Programme" at the 2010 Broadcast Awards. Later that year, it was named "Best Drama" at the Royal Television Society Awards. Gemmell won the "Best Newcomer" award, with Ward and Webb winning the "Best Actress" and "Best Actor" awards respectively. The second series began airing from 17 January 2011 and two months later BBC Daytime Controller, Liam Keelan, renewed Land Girls for a third series. It began airing from 7 November 2011.

HarperImpulse, one of HarperCollins UK’s digital first imprints, signed a three-book deal with Moore to bring Land Girls to literary fiction.  The first, also Moore's first novel, was Land Girls: The Homecoming in 2017, followed by Land Girls: The Promise in 2018. A third, Christmas on the Home Front, was published in 2019.

Humans
On 25 July 2018, it was announced Moore would be head writer on a Chinese version of AMC's Humans, produced by Endemol Shine China and Croton Media. The series began airing on Chinese broadcaster Tencent on February 19, 2021.

Fallen
On 9 September 2022, it was announced Moore would be co-head writing and producing the thriller series Fallen, starring Alexander Siddig, for Brazilian streamer Globoplay.

Big Finish
Moore has contributed audio plays for the Big Finish Doctor Who ranges, starting with the Second Doctor release, The Night Witches. It was inspired by the real life World War Two Russian female flying squadron. Later plays would include Memories of a Tyrant, Shadow of the Daleks 2 and Colony of Fear, the third-to-last release in the Doctor Who Main Range line. He also wrote for the spin-offs The New Counter-Measures, UNIT, Tales From New Earth and The Robots, as well as acting as a script editor on several releases.

Other than Doctor Who, Moore wrote for multiple series of their Survivors range, based on the 1970s BBC television series, created by Terry Nation; Star Cops range, based on the cult 1987 TV series created by Chris Boucher, as well as Space 1999 and The Avengers. He wrote an episode for their Big Finish Originals drama, Transference, starring Alex Kingston, Warren Brown and Ingrid Oliver.

Other work
Moore wrote for the Amazon Prime webseries Cops and Monsters. In March 2021, it was announced Moore was developing a thriller television series for Mopar Studios.

Teaching
Moore has lectured on television screenwriting at Oxford Brookes University and DeMontfort University.

References

External links
 Official Website
 

Living people
21st-century British novelists
British soap opera writers
British television writers
British male novelists
British science fiction writers
English television writers
English screenwriters
English male screenwriters
English soap opera writers
English dramatists and playwrights
English male dramatists and playwrights
British male television writers
Screenwriting instructors
Year of birth missing (living people)
21st-century British screenwriters
21st-century English male writers